Johnny Eduardo (born August 3, 1978) is a Brazilian mixed martial artist currently fighting in the bantamweight division. He has formerly competed for the Ultimate Fighting Championship.

Mixed martial arts career

Early career
Eduardo made his professional MMA debut at the age of sixteen.  He fought exclusively in his native Brazil for the first two years of his career, achieving a record of 11 wins and 3 losses.

In December 1999, Eduardo made his international debut as he faced Takanori Gomi at Vale Tudo Japan 1999.  He lost the fight via rear-naked choke submission.

Eduardo made his United States debut in April 2009 as he fought on one of the early cards for Bellator Fighting Championships.

Ultimate Fighting Championship
Eduardo made his UFC debut against Raphael Assunção on August 27, 2011, at UFC 134. He lost the bout via unanimous decision.

Eduardo was expected to face Michael McDonald on November 19, 2011, at UFC 139. However, Eduardo was forced from the card with an injury and replaced by Alex Soto.

Eduardo fought Jeff Curran at UFC on Fuel TV: Korean Zombie vs. Poirier. Eduardo defeated Curran via unanimous decision, earning him his first win in the UFC.

Eduardo was expected to face Yves Jabouin on March 16, 2013, at UFC 158.  However, on March 6, Eduardo was forced to pull out of the bout citing a shoulder injury.  Jabouin was then pulled from the card as a suitable replacement could not be found on short notice.

Eduardo was expected to face Lucas Martins on November 9, 2013, at UFC Fight Night 32. However, both fighters were removed from the card due to injury.

After almost two years out of the cage, Eduardo returned to the UFC to face Eddie Wineland on May 10, 2014, at UFC Fight Night 40. Despite being a significant betting underdog, he won the fight via KO in the first round. The win also earned Eduardo his first Performance of the Night bonus award.

In May 2015 after a year out of competition due to injury, Eduardo announced he had surgery to repair a torn labrum in his left shoulder, and hoped to have a fight booked in the fall of 2015.

Eduardo faced Aljamain Sterling on December 10, 2015, at UFC Fight Night 80. He lost the fight via submission in the second round.

Eduardo next faced Manvel Gamburyan on November 19, 2016, at UFC Fight Night 100. He won the fight via TKO in the second round.

Eduardo faced Matthew Lopez on June 3, 2017, at UFC 212. He lost the fight via TKO in the first round.

Eduardo faced Nathaniel Wood on June 1, 2018, at UFC Fight Night 131. He lost the fight via D’Arce choke submission in the second round.

Eduardo was scheduled to face Anthony Birchak on March 20, 2021, at UFC on ESPN 21. However, on March 15 Eduardo withdrew from the bout due to visa issues.

Eduardo faced Alejandro Pérez on October 2, 2021, at UFC Fight Night 193. He lost the fight via a scarf hold armlock in round two.

After the loss, Eduardo announced he was no longer under contract with the UFC.

Personal life

He said his hero is Master Luis Alves saying "he was a man that helped shape who I am today."

Championships and accomplishments
International Vale Tudo Championship
IVC 7 Lightweight Tournament Runner Up
Shooto Brazil
Shooto Brazil Lightweight Championship (1 Time)
Ultimate Fighting Championship
Performance of the Night (One time)

Mixed martial arts record

|-
| Loss
| align=center|28–13
| Alejandro Pérez
| Submission (scarf hold armlock)
| UFC Fight Night: Santos vs. Walker
| 
| align=center|2
| align=center|4:13
| Las Vegas, Nevada, United States
| 
|-
|Loss
|align=center|28–12
|Nathaniel Wood
|Submission (D'Arce choke)
|UFC Fight Night: Rivera vs. Moraes
|
|align=center|2
|align=center|2:18
|Utica, New York, United States
| 
|-
|Loss
|align=center|28–11
|Matthew Lopez
|TKO (punches)
|UFC 212
|
|align=center|1
|align=center|2:57
|Rio de Janeiro, Brazil
|
|-
|Win
|align=center|28–10
|Manvel Gamburyan
|TKO (punches)
|UFC Fight Night: Bader vs. Nogueira 2
|
|align=center|2
|align=center|0:46
|São Paulo, Brazil
|
|-
| Loss
| align=center|27–10
| Aljamain Sterling
| Submission (guillotine choke)
| UFC Fight Night: Namajunas vs. VanZant
| 
| align=center|2
| align=center|4:18
| Las Vegas, Nevada, United States
|
|-
| Win
| align=center| 27–9
| Eddie Wineland
| KO (punches)
| UFC Fight Night: Brown vs. Silva
| 
| align=center| 1
| align=center| 4:37
| Cincinnati, Ohio, United States
| 
|-
| Win
| align=center| 26–9
| Jeff Curran
| Decision (unanimous)
| UFC on Fuel TV: Korean Zombie vs. Poirier
| 
| align=center| 3
| align=center| 5:00
| Fairfax, Virginia, United States
| 
|-
| Loss
| align=center| 25–9
| Raphael Assunção
| Decision (unanimous)
| UFC 134
| 
| align=center| 3
| align=center| 5:00
| Rio de Janeiro, Brazil
| 
|-
| Win
| align=center| 25–8
| Jose Wilson
| Submission (rear-naked choke)
| Shooto: Brazil 22
| 
| align=center| 3
| align=center| 2:57
| Brasília, Brazil
| 
|-
| Win
| align=center| 24–8
| Paulo Dantas
| Decision (unanimous)
| Shooto: Brazil 17
| 
| align=center| 3
| align=center| 5:00
| Rio de Janeiro, Brazil
| Won the Shooto Brazil Lightweight Championship. Later vacated title.
|-
| Win
| align=center| 23–8
| Francisco Chagas
| TKO (leg injury)
| Jungle Fight 16
| 
| align=center| 1
|align=center|N/A
| Rio de Janeiro, Brazil
| 
|-
| Win
| align=center| 22–8
| Donald Sanchez
| Decision (unanimous)
| Bellator 3
| 
| align=center| 3
| align=center| 5:00
| Norman, Oklahoma, United States
|
|-
| Win
| align=center| 21–8
| Bruno Alves
| Submission (rear-naked choke)
| The Warriors
| 
| align=center| 3
| 
| Rio de Janeiro, Brazil
| 
|-
| Win
| align=center| 20–8
| Andre Luis Oliveira
| TKO (punches)
| Shooto: Brazil 10
| 
| align=center| 1
| align=center| 2:11
| Rio de Janeiro, Brazil
| 
|-
| Win
| align=center| 19–8
| Munil Adriano
| TKO (punches)
| Real Fight 6
| 
| align=center| 1
| align=center| 2:20
| São José dos Campos, Brazil
| 
|-
| Win
| align=center| 18–8
| Francisco Ramos
| Submission (anaconda choke)
| Win Fight and Entertainment 1
| 
| align=center| 1
| align=center| 3:56
| Salvador, Brazil
| 
|-
| Win
| align=center| 17–8
| Cristiano Bananada
| Submission (armbar)
| The Glory
| 
| align=center| 2
| align=center| 1:29
| Niterói, Brazil
| 
|-
| Win
| align=center| 16–8
| Erinaldo Rodrigues
| KO (punches)
| Jungle Fight 9: Warriors
| 
|align=center|N/A
|align=center|N/A
| Rio de Janeiro, Brazil
| 
|-
| Win
| align=center| 15–8
| Marcos Maciel 
| TKO (punches) 
| Rio FC 1
| 
| align=center| 2
| align=center| 2:27
| Rio de Janeiro, Brazil
| 
|-
| Loss
| align=center| 14–8
| Miguel Angel Duran
| Submission (punches)
| Shooto Brazil 3: The Evolution
| 
| align=center| 1
|align=center|N/A
| Rio de Janeiro, Brazil
| 
|-
| Loss
| align=center| 14–7
| Milton Vieira
| Submission (anaconda choke)
| Super Challenge 1
| 
| align=center| 2
|align=center|N/A
| Barueri, Brazil
| 
|-
| Win
| align=center| 14–6
| Aritano Silva 
| Submission (arm-triangle choke)
| Gold Fighters Championship 1
| 
| align=center| 1
|align=center|N/A
| Rio de Janeiro, Brazil
| 
|-
| Win
| align=center| 13–6
| Jose Adriano
| Submission (heel hook)
| Guarafight 2
| 
| align=center| 1
| align=center| 1:08
| Guarapari, Brazil
| 
|-
| Loss
| align=center| 12–6
| Vusal Bayramov
| Submission (armbar)
| Conquista Fight 1
| 
| align=center| 1
| align=center| 3:19
| Vitória da Conquista, Brazil
| 
|-
| Win
| align=center| 12–5
| Marcelo Cobra
| Decision (unanimous)
| K - NOCK
| 
| align=center| 3
| align=center| 5:00
| Rio de Janeiro, Brazil
| 
|-
| Loss
| align=center| 11–5
| Takuya Kuwabara
| Decision (unanimous)
| Shooto - R.E.A.D. 2
| 
| align=center| 3
| align=center| 5:00
| Tokyo, Japan
| Bantamweight debut.
|-
| Loss
| align=center| 11–4
| Takanori Gomi
| Submission (rear-naked choke)
| Vale Tudo Japan 1999
| 
| align=center| 3
| align=center| 1:43
| Urayasu, Japan
| 
|-
| Loss
| align=center| 11–3
| Haroldo Bunn
| Submission (kneebar)
| IVC 13Ç: The New Generation of Lightweights
| 
| align=center| 1
| align=center| 7:40
| São Paulo, Brazil
| 
|-
| Loss
| align=center| 11–2
| Sergio Melo
| Submission (rear-naked choke)
|rowspan=3| IVC 7: The New Champions
|rowspan=3| 
| align=center| 1
| align=center| 16:25
|rowspan=3| São Paulo, Brazil
| IVC 7 Lightweight Tournament Final.
|-
| Win
| align=center| 11–1
| Fabio Alves
| Submission (punches)
| align=center| 1
| align=center| 3:30
| IVC 7 Lightweight Tournament Semifinal.
|-
| Win
| align=center| 10–1
| Vanderci Garcia
| Submission (punches)
| align=center| 1
| align=center| 2:07
| IVC 7 Lightweight Tournament Quarterfinal.
|-
| Win
| align=center| 9–1
| Thiago Santana
| Decision (unanimous)
|rowspan=2| Campos de Jordão Freestyle
|rowspan=2| 
| align=center| 2
| align=center| 8:00
|rowspan=2| Campos do Jordão, Brazil
| 
|-
| Win
| align=center| 8–1
| Rudi Desouza
| Submission (rear-naked choke)
| align=center| 1
|align=center|N/A
| 
|-
| Win
| align=center| 7–1
| Wanderley Esmala
| Submission (triangle choke)
| Desafio: Freestyle de Campos
| 
| align=center| 1
| align=center| 15:49
| Rio de Janeiro, Brazil
| 
|-
| Win
| align=center| 6–1
| Arivaldo Souza
| TKO (punches)
|rowspan=3| Guaratinguetá Freestyle 1
|rowspan=3| 
| align=center| 2
|align=center|N/A
|rowspan=3| Guaratinguetá, Brazil
| 
|-
| Win
| align=center| 5–1
| Guilherme Santos
| Submission (rear-naked choke)
| align=center| 1
|align=center|N/A
| 
|-
| Win
| align=center| 4–1
| Marcos Rodrigues
| Decision (unanimous)
| align=center| 2
| align=center| 8:00
| 
|-
| Win
| align=center| 3–1
| Douglas Nascimento
| Submission (ankle lock)
|rowspan=3| Itajubá Freestyle Open
|rowspan=3| 
| align=center| 3
|align=center|N/A
|rowspan=3| Itajubá, Brazil
| 
|-
| Win
| align=center| 2–1
| Claudionor Silva
| Decision (unanimous)
| align=center| 2
| align=center| 8:00
| 
|-
| Win
| align=center| 1–1
| Paulo Arum
| Submission (heel hook)
| align=center| 1
| align=center| N/A
| 
|-
| Loss
| align=center| 0–1
| Wander Braga
| Submission (rear-naked choke)
| BVF 6: Campeonato Brasileiro de Vale Tudo 1
| 
| align=center| 1
| align=center| 4:33
| Belo Horizonte, Brazil
|

See also
 List of male mixed martial artists

References

External links
 
 

Bantamweight mixed martial artists
Mixed martial artists utilizing Brazilian jiu-jitsu
Brazilian male mixed martial artists
Brazilian practitioners of Brazilian jiu-jitsu
People awarded a black belt in Brazilian jiu-jitsu
1978 births
Living people
Sportspeople from Rio de Janeiro (city)
Ultimate Fighting Championship male fighters